Algis Jankauskas (born 27 September 1982) is a Lithuanian former professional football player.

Honours
Individual
A Lyga Team of the Year: 2018

References

External links
 

1982 births
Living people
Lithuanian footballers
Lithuania international footballers
Lithuanian expatriate footballers
Association football defenders
A Lyga players
FK Žalgiris players
FK Vėtra players
FK Sūduva Marijampolė players
Expatriate footballers in Russia
Lithuanian expatriate sportspeople in Russia
FC Amkar Perm players
Russian Premier League players